The Hague  Convention on the International Recovery of Child Support and Other Forms of Family Maintenance, also referred to as the Hague Maintenance Convention or the Hague Child Support Convention is a multilateral treaty governing the enforcement of judicial decisions regarding child support (and other forms of family support) extraterritorially. It is one of a number of conventions in the area of private international law of the Hague Conference on Private International Law in 2007. The convention is open to all states as well as to Regional Economic Integration Organizations as long as they are composed of sovereign states only and have sovereignty in (part of) the content of the convention. The convention entered into force on 1 January 2013 between Norway and Albania, with Bosnia-Herzegovina (2013), Ukraine (2013), the European Union (2014, except with respect to Denmark), Montenegro (2017), United States (2017), Turkey (2017), Kazakhstan (2017), Brazil (2017), Honduras (2017), Belarus (2018), Guyana (2020), Nicaragua (2020), United Kingdom (2021), Serbia (2021), New Zealand (2021), Ecuador (2022),  Botswana (2022) and Azerbaijan (2023) following suit. Because the EU acceptance of the convention applies in 27 EU countries, the convention applies in 45 countries worldwide.

Forms of maintenance
Three forms of maintenance form the core of the convention and are defined in article 2:
obligations towards children below the age of 21 (or 18, if a reservation is made)
spousal support in a case linked to child support
spousal support (with limited governmental assistance in obtaining results)
A country can further declare to apply the convention to other forms of family maintenance: "any maintenance obligation arising from a family relationship, parentage, marriage or affinity, including in particular obligations in respect of vulnerable persons". Such a wider scope is only valid between two member states if both have an increase to scope.

Procedure
States Parties are to establish a Central Authority for the convention. The Authority in the country of residence of the requester  is the authority through which requests for enforcement of judicial or administrative decisions can be made, while the authority in the country to which the request is lodged  should provide further -free- help with the application. As the convention is based on enforcement of judicial decisions, the merit of the decision itself may not be taken into account. The request should include the decision as well as proof that the "respondent had proper notice of the proceedings and an opportunity to be heard, or that the respondent had proper notice of the decision and the opportunity to challenge or appeal it on fact and law". The receiving authority is required to actively enforce the decisions by means which are at least as effective as those used when enforcing decisions within that country. They may include withholding of wages or social security payments or garnishments from bank accounts. Also public bodies may request enforcement if they are eligible to receive payments because one of the parties has made a claim to public funds.

States parties

The convention entered into force on 1 January 2013 following ratification by two states: Albania and Norway. For Bosnia-Herzegovina and Ukraine, the convention entered into force one later in 2013. The European Union became a party in 2014 as a Regional Economic Integration Organization. Because the subject matter of the convention fully falls within EU competency, the EU rather than the individual member states became a party. The convention is applicable to all 27 member states except Denmark and only applies to those territories that form part of the European Union. Also the UK was covered by the European Union territory with regards to this convention until 1 January 2021 (the end of the transition period, when it became a member itself. In December 2015, and July 2016, Montenegro and Turkey respectively acceded to the convention, which entered into force for it on 1 January 2017 and February 2017 respectively, for those parties that have not objected to the accession. The convention entered into force for the US on 1 January 2017 following ratification in September 2016.  The United States Senate approved the treaty in 2010, and implementation legislation has been passed on a federal level (Preventing Sex Trafficking and Strengthening Families Act, public law 113-183). Ratification could only take place after legislation at state level (UIFSA 2008) had been passed in 54 jurisdictions (the 50 states, DC, Virgin Islands, Puerto Rico, Guam), which was done in March 2016.

Signatories that did not ratify are Burkina Faso, Canada, Philippines and North Macedonia.

The convention does not apply between the United States and Kazakhstan and the United States and Guyana, following the objection of the US to the accession those countries, as those countries did not provide information about their child support legislation and procedures in their country.

Relationship to other Conventions
The convention revises two Hague Conventions as well a United Nations convention relating to family support. When the convention is in force on the territories of members which are also parties to one of those conventions, the 2007 convention is applicable.

Protocol

Which law is applicable on maintenance obligations is not governed by the conventions but by a protocol concluded on the same day. In 2010, it was ratified by the European Union, which declared it had competence over all matters concerning the protocol with regards to all its member states except for Denmark and the United Kingdom. It applied the Protocol since 2011 provisionally, also between its member states within the Maintenance regulation. Serbia has ratified the Protocol on 10 April 2013, leading to entry into force of the convention on 1 August 2013. Afterwards Kazakhstan (2016), Brazil (2017), Ecuador (2022) and Ukraine (2022) became parties. North Macedonia has signed the convention, but did not ratify it.

Applicable law
The applicable law that is determined by the convention is not restricted to the laws of the parties to the convention: it is therefore possible that a law of a non-state party is chosen. As a general rule, the law of the habitual residence of the creditor (the person obtaining maintenance) habitual residence applies. In cases of parents towards their children, children towards their parents, and persons regarding young persons (under 21, and if there is no spousal relationship) the following 3 laws are considered in a so-called cascade:
Law of the debtor (general rule under the convention), but if that leads to no maintenance
Law of the forum, and if that leads to no maintenance:
Law of the common nationality
If the court seized is the debtor's habitual residence, the first two applicable laws are reversed leading to the following cascade:
Law of the forum (the law of the debtor's habitual residence), but if that leads to no maintenance
Law of the creditor (general rule under the convention), and if that leads to no maintenance:
Law of the common nationality
In the cases of (former) spouses, either party may object to the use of the law of the creditor's habitual residence, instead using the law which as a closer connection with the marriage if "the law of another State, in particular the State of their last common habitual residence, has a closer connection with the marriage". 
In cases where both parties share a nationality and the law of that nationality as well as the law of the debtor's habitual residence would not lead to maintenance, a debtor may also contest to use of the law of the creditor's habitual residence, provided it is not a case relating to child support. 
In cases not concerning child support (for children below 18) or vulnerable adults, both parties may choose the law governing the maintenance, choosing from:
law of nationality (of one of the parties)
law of the habitual residence (of one of the parties)
law applied to their property regime
law applied to their divorce or legal separation

See also
International matrimonial law

Notes

References

External links 
Treaty text
Ratifications

Hague Conference on Private International Law conventions
Treaties concluded in 2007
Treaties entered into force in 2013
Family law treaties
Child support
Treaties of Albania
Treaties of Azerbaijan
Treaties of Belarus
Treaties of Bosnia and Herzegovina
Treaties of Botswana
Treaties of Brazil
Treaties of Ecuador
Treaties entered into by the European Union
Treaties of Guyana
Treaties of Honduras
Treaties of Kazakhstan
Treaties of Montenegro
Treaties of New Zealand
Treaties of Nicaragua
Treaties of Norway
Treaties of Serbia
Treaties of Turkey
Treaties of Ukraine
Treaties of the United Kingdom
Treaties of the United States
Treaties extended to Gibraltar
2007 in the Netherlands